Gwyn Arch MBE (4 May 1931 – June 2021) was a British musical arranger, composer, and choir director.

Early life 

Arch was born in Southampton on 4 May 1931, to a Welsh father. He was raised in Birmingham and then Ipswich, where he attended secondary school. After national service he studied English at Selwyn College, University of Cambridge. He played in jazz bands there and at University of Oxford, where he took a postgraduate diploma in education.

Career 
Arch taught English at Rickmansworth Grammar School for nine years, studying musical composition at Trinity College London in his spare time. He was Director of Music at Bulmershe College from 1964 to 1985. In the 1960s he arranged music for BBC Home Service radio programmes for schools, and in the 1970s, he made several appearances, as a conductor, on the BBC Television programme Seeing and Believing.

He was musical director of the South Chiltern Choral Society for almost 50 years, retiring in 2014. In 1971 he established the Reading Male Voice Choir and served as the choir's musical director until 2015. He was a Licentiate of the Royal Academy of Music, a Composition Fellow of Trinity College London, and for ten years an Associated Board examiner. His oeuvre includes many arrangements of choral works and songs, in a wide variety of genres, for mixed (SATB), male (TTBB), and female (SSA) choirs.  He marketed many of his arrangements for male voice choirs as sheet music via his company Grove Music.

Honours 
Arch was appointed a Member of the Order of the British Empire (MBE) in the 2006 Birthday Honours, for services to music in Berkshire.

The Gwyn Arch Foundation was launched in his memory on 9 April 2022 at a celebration concert featuring several of the choirs he founded. It aims "to support the development and performance of choral music by and for young people within the Thames Valley".

Personal life 

Arch met Jane, subsequently a head teacher, when he was at Oxford University, where he was musical director of the Experimental Theatre Club and she was in the choir. They married two years later, and moved to Sonning Common in 1964. Their elder son David Arch is also a conductor, arranger and composer and is the musical director on the BBC Television show Strictly Come Dancing. Their younger son Jonathan has a daughter Lucy who is a professional cellist, playing regularly with the BBC Philharmonic Orchestra.

Arch's death was announced on 8 June 2021.

Notes

References 

1931 births
2021 deaths
British choral conductors
20th-century British composers
21st-century British composers
Musicians from Birmingham, West Midlands
Musicians from Ipswich
Members of the Order of the British Empire
Teachers of English
Alumni of Trinity College of Music
Alumni of Selwyn College, Cambridge
Alumni of the University of Oxford
People from Berkshire (before 1974)